Argillichthys toombsi is an extinct lizardfish from the Ypresian-aged London Clay Formation from Lower Eocene England.  It is known from a skull.

See also

Other notable extinct Cenozoic aulopiforms include:
Alepisaurus paronai, an extinct lancetfish that lived in middle Miocene Piemonte
Polymerichthys, another extinct alepisauroid from Middle Miocene Japan

References

Synodontidae
Eocene fish
Prehistoric life of Europe